San Andrés is a municipality in the department of El Petén in Guatemala. The municipality is formed by the town of San Andrés, located on the north-western shore of Lake Petén Itzá, and 55 rural communities, with a total population of 20,295 people (census 2002).

The municipality was created in 1962 and has a territory 8,874 km², equivalent to 25% of the department of El Petén. In the 1990s, more than 93% (8,288 km²) of the municipality's territory was declared protected nature reserve by the central government.

References

Municipalities of the Petén Department